J. H. Smith (1858–1956) was a politician and pioneer.

Biography
Smith was born John Henry Smith on September 12, 1858, in Dousman, Wisconsin. He died on February 15, 1956, in Everett, Washington.

Career
Smith served as Mayor of Everett from 1924 to 1928. Later, he would co-found the city of Anchorage, Alaska.

References

1858 births
1956 deaths
Mayors of places in Washington (state)
Politicians from Anchorage, Alaska
Politicians from Everett, Washington
People from Waukesha County, Wisconsin